The John Randall House is a historic house on Connecticut Route 2 in North Stonington, Connecticut.  Its earliest section dates to 1685, with the main block reaching its present configuration before 1720. The house was restored in the 1930s by early preservationist Norman Isham and listed on the National Register of Historic Places on December 1, 1978.

Description and history
It is a -story wood-frame structure, five asymmetrical bays wide, with a massive central stone chimney and clapboarded exterior. Its main entrance is framed by pilasters and a corniced entablature. The house is framed with inch-thick planking, a common technique of the period, although the planking was usually thinner, and is suggestive of two distinct periods of construction. The eastern parlor has a large fireplace wall finished in wooden paneling, the fireplace flanked by pilasters. The western parlor has a period built-in cabinet, wainscoting, and original plasterwork. The house was part of a farm named Anguilla Farm by the namesake son of the original proprietor, John Randall, a husbandman and Sabbatarian from England.

See also

List of the oldest buildings in Connecticut
National Register of Historic Places listings in New London County, Connecticut

References

Houses on the National Register of Historic Places in Connecticut
Houses completed in 1690
Houses in New London County, Connecticut
North Stonington, Connecticut
National Register of Historic Places in New London County, Connecticut
1690 establishments in Connecticut